1902 Shaposhnikov is a dark Hilda asteroid from the outermost region of the asteroid belt, approximately 92 kilometers in diameter. It was discovered on 18 April 1972, by Russian astronomer Tamara Smirnova at the Crimean Astrophysical Observatory in Nauchnyj, on the Crimean peninsula. The asteroid was named after Soviet astronomer and WWII casualty Vladimir Shaposhnikov. It was one of the last larger asteroids discovered in the main belt.

Orbit and characteristics 

Shaposhnikov belongs to the dynamic Hilda group. Members of this group stay in a 3:2 orbital resonance with the gas giant Jupiter and are located in the outermost part of the asteroid belt. Shaposhnikov is, however, not a member of the collisional Hilda family but a non-family asteroid of the background population when applying the Hierarchical Clustering Method to its proper orbital elements. It orbits the Sun at a distance of 3.1–4.8 AU once every 7 years and 11 months (2,884 days; semi-major axis of 3.97 AU). Its orbit has an eccentricity of 0.22 and an inclination of 12° with respect to the ecliptic.

Naming 

This minor planet was named in honour of Vladimir Grigorevich Shaposhnikov (1905–1942), who worked at the Simeiz Observatory and was an expert in astrometry, before he was killed on the Eastern Front during the Second World War. The official  was published by the Minor Planet Center on 20 February 1976.

Physical characteristics 

In the Tholen classification, Shaposhnikov is an X-type asteroid, which encompasses the E, M and P-types. Since its albedo is known to be very low (see below), its spectral type has been refined to a primitive P-type asteroid. In addition, it has been characterized as a D-type asteroid in the Bus–DeMeo taxonomy.

Rotation period and poles 

Several rotational lightcurves of Shaposhnikov have been obtained from photometric observations since 1989. Lightcurve analysis gave a consolidated rotation period of 21.2 hours with a brightness amplitude between 0.29 and 0.42 magnitude. Most asteroid have periods below 20 hours.

A 2016-published study also modeled Shaposhnikovs lightcurve using photometric data from various sources. It gave a sidereal period of 20.9959 hours, as well as a spin axis in ecliptic coordinates (λ, β) of (326.0°, 37.0°) and (144.0°, 79.0°).

Diameter and albedo 

According to the surveys carried out by the Infrared Astronomical Satellite IRAS, the Japanese Akari satellite and the NEOWISE mission of NASA's Wide-field Infrared Survey Explorer, Shaposhnikov measures between 83.443 and 96.86 kilometers in diameter and its surface has a low albedo between 0.0296 and 0.04.

The Collaborative Asteroid Lightcurve Link derives an albedo of 0.0385 and a diameter of 97.01 kilometers based on an absolute magnitude of 9.22.

Based on current diameter estimates, Shaposhnikov is the most recent discovered outer main-belt asteroid that is near the 100-kilometer diameter range. The next larger asteroid, 1390 Abastumani (101 km) was already discovered in the 1930s, four decades earlier.

Notes

References

External links 
 Lightcurve Database Query (LCDB), at www.minorplanet.info
 Dictionary of Minor Planet Names, Google books
 Asteroids and comets rotation curves, CdR – Geneva Observatory, Raoul Behrend
 Discovery Circumstances: Numbered Minor Planets (1)-(5000) – Minor Planet Center
 
 

001902
Discoveries by Tamara Mikhaylovna Smirnova
Named minor planets
001902
19720418